R Airlines, legally incorporated as Skyview Airways Co. Ltd., was a Thai charter airline headquartered in the Don Mueang District, Bangkok and based out of nearby Don Mueang International Airport. It ceased operations on 18 February 2018.

History
The airline was founded in 2012 and commenced operations on 24 January 2013. It ceased operations on 18 February 2018.

Destinations
R Airlines operated to the following destinations within Thailand before the suspension of operations:
Bangkok - Don Mueang International Airport (Primary Hub)
Chiang Mai - Chiang Mai International Airport
Hat Yai - Hat Yai International Airport
Khon Kaen - Khon Kaen Airport
Narathiwat - Narathiwat Airport
Phitsanulok - Phitsanulok Airport
Phuket - Phuket International Airport

Fleet

The R Airlines fleet consisted of the following aircraft:

References

External links

 
 Facebook Page

Defunct airlines of Thailand
Airlines established in 2012
Airlines disestablished in 2018
Thai companies established in 2012
2018 disestablishments in Thailand